Alderwood School is a coeducational all-through school located over three sites in Aldershot in Hampshire, England. It was formed in September 2017 from the merger of Belle Vue Infant School, Newport Junior School and The Connaught School.

History

The secondary department of the school started life as Heron Wood County Secondary School for Boys in 1964. In 1987, with the closure of the nearby Manor Park Girls' School, it became coeducational and was renamed The Connaught School.

In 2011 The Connaught School, in partnership with Aldershot Town FC won the National LiteracyActionNet Award for Double Club, an after school provision for pupils and parents that teaches skills in both Literacy and Sport.

In June 2013 an Ofsted inspection was made of English and Literacy across The Connaught School, the outcome of which was ‘Good’ with outstanding features. Ofsted remarked on the “excellent provision” for pupils and also on “commitment across the curriculum” to raising standards. It was also noted in the report that “pupils across the school are making good progress.” A further Ofsted inspection of the school in 2015 rated it as "Requires Improvement". Recent years have seen a large increase in numbers of students with English as an additional language (EAL) with 30% of students being EAL in 2019 compared to a national average of 16.9%.

In 2017, as a result of these Ofsted reports and considering that The Connaught School had "performed relatively weakly on attainment measures for the previous three years" (in 2015 29% of students attained 5 good GCSEs including English and mathematics compared to a national average of 57% placing the school well below the minimum Government Floor Standard of 40%) Hampshire County Council decided to merge The Connaught School with the Federation of Newport Junior School and Belle Vue Infant School from September 2017, to create a single all-through (age 4 to 16) school to collectively be called Alderwood School. A further Ofsted inspection across all three sites in January 2020 rated the school as "Good".

In 2018 Young Sherlock Holmes author Andrew Lane gave a talk to students at the school while in 2019 the actor Gerald Charles Dickens, the great-great grandson of Charles Dickens, performed his one-man show of A Christmas Carol in the school hall. Dickens returned to the school to give a repeat performance in October 2021.

Today
Recent visits in support of learning include: the Natural History Museum; the Imperial War Museum;  the Old Operating Theatre Museum and St Thomas' Hospital; Portsmouth Dockyard, the Mary Rose and HMS Victory while theatre trips include Romeo and Juliet at Shakespeare's Globe, The Tempest and An Inspector Calls at the Yvonne Arnaud Theatre in Guildford. In addition, the Physical Education department organises an annual sporting tour of Europe during which students play matches against local teams while at the same time experiencing local culture and customs.

Students at the secondary school are involved in an annual performance in the school hall. These include the musicals School of Rock (2018), The Addams Family (2019), Grease (2020) and Hairspray (2022).

Alderwood School is a partner school of the Sixth Form College in nearby Farnborough. Since 2018 the school has been home to Aldershot Town F.C. Academy which has the use of classrooms in the school in addition to the 24-hour astroturf and gymnasium.

Houses
Until the summer of 2021 pupils were affiliated to one of four houses:
 Marlborough
 Montgomery
 Stanhope
 Wellington

Given the town's strong military connection, the houses were named after former barracks in Aldershot which in turn were named after great military leaders and a Secretary of State for War.

In 2021 the houses were renamed to reflect a more inclusive range of historical figures:

 Seacole
 Nightingale
 Pankhurst
 Turing

Notable pupils

As Heron Wood
Russell Foster CBE, FRS, FMedSci, professor of circadian neuroscience, the Director of the Nuffield Laboratory of Ophthalmology and Nicholas Kurti Senior Fellow at Brasenose College at the University of Oxford.
Ronald Cavaye, classical pianist and writer.
Floyd Manderson, athlete who competed in the men's high jump at the 1988 Summer Olympics.
Stephen McKay, Distinguished Professor in Social Research at the University of Lincoln.
 Seamus Perry, Fellow of Balliol College, Oxford and since 2014 a Professor in the English Faculty at the University of Oxford.

As Connaught School
Amelle Berrabah of the girl group the Sugababes.
Alex Reid, mixed martial artist and former husband of English model Katie Price.

References

External links
 Alderwood School official website

Secondary schools in Hampshire
Primary schools in Hampshire
Buildings and structures in Aldershot
Educational institutions established in 1964
1964 establishments in England
Community schools in Hampshire